BASE jumping is the recreational sport of jumping from fixed objects, using a parachute to descend safely to the ground. "BASE" is an acronym that stands for four categories of fixed objects from which one can jump: buildings, antennae (referring to radio masts), spans (bridges), and earth (cliffs). Participants exit from a fixed object such as a cliff, and after an optional freefall delay, deploy a parachute to slow their descent and land. A popular form of BASE jumping is wingsuit BASE jumping.

In contrast to other forms of parachuting, such as skydiving from airplanes, BASE jumps are performed from fixed objects which are generally at much lower altitudes, and BASE jumpers only carry one parachute.
BASE jumping is significantly more hazardous than other forms of parachuting, and is widely considered to be one of the most dangerous extreme sports.

History

Precursors 
Fausto Veranzio is widely believed to have been the first person to build and test a parachute, by jumping from St Mark's Campanile in Venice in 1617 when he was over 65 years old. However, these and other sporadic incidents were one-time experiments, not the actual systematic pursuit of a new form of parachuting.

Birth of B.A.S.E. jumping 
There are precursors to the sport dating back hundreds of years. In 1966, Michael Pelkey and Brian Schubert jumped from El Capitan in Yosemite National Park. The acronym "B.A.S.E." (now more commonly "BASE") was later coined by filmmaker Carl Boenish, his wife Jean Boenish, Phil Smith, and Phil Mayfield. Carl Boenish was an important catalyst behind modern BASE jumping, and in 1978 he filmed jumps from El Capitan, made using ram-air parachutes and the freefall tracking technique. While BASE jumps had been made prior to that time, the El Capitan activity was the effective birth of what is now called BASE jumping.

After 1978, the filmed jumps from El Capitan were repeated, not as an actual publicity exercise or as a movie stunt, but as a true recreational activity. It was this that popularized BASE jumping more widely among parachutists. Carl Boenish continued to publish films and informational magazines on BASE jumping until his death in 1984 after a BASE jump off the Troll Wall. By this time, the concept had spread among skydivers worldwide, with hundreds of participants making fixed-object jumps.

During the early eighties, nearly all BASE jumps were made using standard skydiving equipment, including two parachutes (main and reserve), and deployment components. Later on, specialized equipment and techniques were developed specifically for the unique needs of BASE jumping.

BASE numbers 
BASE numbers are awarded to those who have made at least one jump from each of the four categories (buildings, antennas, spans and earth). When Phil Smith and Phil Mayfield jumped together from a Houston skyscraper on 18 January 1981, they became the first to attain the exclusive BASE numbers (BASE #1 and #2, respectively), having already jumped from an antenna, spans, and earthen objects. Jean and Carl Boenish qualified for BASE numbers 3 and 4 soon after. A separate "award" was soon enacted for Night BASE jumping when Mayfield completed each category at night, becoming Night BASE #1, with Smith qualifying a few weeks later.

Upon completing a jump from all of the four object categories, a jumper may choose to apply for a "BASE number", awarded sequentially. The 1000th application for a BASE number was filed in March 2005 and BASE #1000 was awarded to Matt "Harley" Moilanen of Grand Rapids, Michigan. , over 2,000 BASE numbers have been issued.

Equipment 
In the early days of BASE jumping, people used modified skydiving gear, such as by removing the deployment bag and slider, stowing the lines in a tail pocket, and fitting a large pilot chute. However, modified skydiving gear is then prone to kinds of malfunction that are rare in normal skydiving (such as "line-overs" and broken lines). Modern purpose-built BASE jumping equipment is considered to be much safer and more reliable.

Parachute 
The biggest difference in gear is that skydivers jump with both a main and a reserve parachute, while BASE jumpers carry only one parachute. Vents are one element that make a parachute suitable for BASE jumping. BASE jumpers often use extra large pilot chutes to compensate for lower airspeed parachute deployments. On jumps from lower altitudes, the slider is removed for faster parachute opening.

Harness and container 
BASE jumpers use a single-parachute harness and container system. Since there is only a single parachute, BASE jumping containers are mechanically much simpler than skydiving containers. This simplicity contributes to the safety and reliability of BASE jumping gear by eliminating many malfunctions that can occur with more complicated skydiving equipment. Since there is no reserve parachute, there is little need to cut-away their parachute, many BASE harnesses do not contain a 3-ring release system.

Clothing 
When jumping from high mountains, BASE jumpers will often use special clothing to improve control and flight characteristics in the air. Wingsuit flying has become a popular form of BASE jumping in recent years, that allows jumpers to glide over long horizontal distances. Tracking suits inflate like wingsuits to give additional lift to jumpers, but maintain separation of arms and legs to allow for greater mobility and safety.

Technique 
BASE jumps can be broadly classified into low jumps and high jumps. The primary distinguishing characteristic of low BASE jumps versus high BASE jumps is the use of a slider reefing device to control the opening speed of the parachute, and whether the jumper falls long enough to reach terminal velocity.

Low BASE jumps 
Low BASE jumps are those where the jumper does not reach terminal velocity. Sometimes referred to as "slider down" jumps because they are typically performed without a slider reefing device on the parachute. The lack of a slider enables the parachute to open more quickly. Other techniques for low BASE jumps include the use of a static line, direct bag, or PCA (pilot chute assist). These devices form an attachment between the parachute and the jump platform, which stretches out the parachute and suspension lines as the jumper falls, before separating and allowing the parachute to inflate. This enables the very lowest jumps—below  to be made. It is common in the UK to jump from around the  mark, due to the number of low cliffs at this height.

High BASE jumps 

Many BASE jumpers are motivated to make jumps from higher objects involving free fall. High BASE jumps are those which are high enough for the jumper to reach terminal velocity. High BASE jumps are often called "slider up" jumps due to the use of a slider reefing device.
High BASE jumps present different hazards than low BASE jumps. With greater height and airspeed, jumpers can fly away from the cliff during freefall, allowing them to deploy their parachute far away from the cliff they jumped from and significantly reduce the chance of object striking. However, high BASE jumps also present new hazards such as complications resulting from the use of a wingsuit.

Tandem BASE jumps 
Tandem BASE jumping is when a skilled pilot jumps with a passenger attached to their front. It is similar to skydiving and is offered in the US. Tandem BASE is becoming a more accessible and legal form of BASE jumping.

Records 
 Lowest

 Biggest
 Guinness World Records first listed a BASE jumping record with Carl Boenish's 1984 leap from Trollveggen (Troll Wall) in Norway. It was described as the highest BASE jump. The jump was made two days before Boenish's death at the same site.

 Highest altitude
 On August 26, 1992, Australians Nic Feteris and Glenn Singleman made a BASE jump from an altitude of  jump off Great Trango Towers Pakistan. It was the world's highest BASE jump off the earth at the time.

They jumped in wingsuits.

Using a specially-developed Red Bull wingsuit, he glided down to the Rongbuk glacier more than 1,000 meters below, setting a new world record for highest altitude base jump. He had previously jumped off mountains in Asia, Antarctica and South America in 2004, 2007, 2008, 2010 and 2012. 

He later died while attempting another high-altitude BASE jump in Nepal in 2017.

 Other
 Other records include Captain Daniel G. Schilling setting the Guinness World Record for the most BASE jumps in a twenty-four-hour period. Schilling jumped off the Perrine Bridge in Twin Falls, Idaho, a record 201 times on July 8, 2006. In 2018 at Eikesdalen, Norway a world record was set with 69 BASE jumpers jumping from the cliff Katthammaren.

Competitions 
BASE competitions have been held since the early 1980s, with accurate landings or free-fall aerobatics used as the judging criteria. In 2012 the World Wingsuit League held their first wingsuit BASE jumping competition in China.

Notable jumps
 February 2, 1912 Frederick R. Law parachuted from the top of the torch of the Statue of Liberty, 305 ft above the ground.
 February 4, 1912, Franz Reichelt, tailor, jumped from the first deck of the Eiffel Tower testing his invention, the coat parachute, and died when he hit the ground. It was his first-ever attempt with the parachute and both the authorities and the spectators believed he intended to test it using a dummy.
 In 1913, it is claimed that Štefan Banič successfully jumped from a 15-story building to demonstrate his parachute design.
 In 1913, Russian student Vladimir Ossovski (Владимир Оссовский), from the Saint-Petersburg Conservatory, jumped from the 53-meter high bridge over the river Seine in Rouen (France), using the parachute RK-1, invented a year before that by Gleb Kotelnikov (1872–1944). Ossovski planned to jump from the Eiffel Tower too, but the Parisian authorities did not allow it.
 In 1965, Erich Felbermayr from Wels jumped from the Kleine Zinne / Cima piccola di Lavaredo in the Dolomites.
 In 1966, Michael Pelkey and Brian Schubert jumped from El Capitan in the Yosemite Valley.
 On January 31, 1972, Rick Sylvester skied off Yosemite Valley's El Capitan, making the first ski-BASE jump.
 On November 9, 1975, the first person to parachute off the CN Tower in Toronto, Ontario, Canada, was Bill Eustace, a member of the tower's construction crew. He was fired.
 On July 22, 1975, Owen J. Quinn parachuted from the North Tower of the World Trade Center to publicize the plight of the poor.
 In 1976, Rick Sylvester skied off Canada's Mount Asgard for the ski chase sequence of the James Bond movie The Spy Who Loved Me, giving the wider world its first look at BASE jumping.
 In 1979, Santee, California skydiver Roger Worthington completed one of the first "Span" jumps when he successfully parachuted off of the newly constructed 450 foot Pine Valley Creek Bridge (A.K.A. Nello Irwin Greer Memorial Bridge) on Interstate 8 in San Diego County. Upon take off he held a red smoke flare in each hand. When interviewed afterward he claimed to know of no other "bridge jumpers" in the country.
Upon landing, Allwood discarded and secured his parachute, then used a full-sized reserve parachute to BASE jump into Hyde Park below.
 In 1986, Welshman Eric Jones became the first person to BASE jump from the Eiger.
 On October 22, 1999, Jan Davis died while attempting a BASE jump from El Capitan in Yosemite Valley. Davis' jump was part of an organized act of civil disobedience protesting the NPS air delivery regulations (36 CFR 2.17(a)), which make BASE jumping illegal in national park areas.
 In 2000, Hannes Arch and Ueli Gegenschatz were the first to BASE jump from the 1800-metre-high north face of the Eiger.
 In 2005, Karina Hollekim became the first woman to perform a ski-BASE.
 In 2009, three women—29-year-old Australian Livia Dickie, 28-year-old Venezuelan Ana Isabel Dao, and 32-year-old Norwegian Anniken Binz—BASE jumped from Angel Falls, the highest waterfall in the world. Ana Isabel Dao was the first Venezuelan woman to jump off Angel Falls.
 On September 11, 2013, the first Suspension BASE jump was made (Power tower in Konakovo)
 In September 2013, three men jumped off the then-under-construction One World Trade Center in New York City. Footage of their jump was recorded using head cams and can be seen on YouTube. In March 2014, the three jumpers and one accomplice on the ground were arrested after turning themselves in.

Comparison with skydiving

BASE jumps are typically performed from much lower altitudes than in skydiving. Skydivers are required to deploy their main parachute above  altitude. A BASE jump from a  object is only about 5.6 seconds from the ground if the jumper remains in free fall. Standard skydiving parachute systems are not designed for this situation, so BASE jumpers use specially designed harnesses and parachute systems.

Many BASE jumps, particularly in the UK are made from around 150ft due to the number of low cliffs at this height. Jumpers will use a static line method to ensure their canopy is extracted as they jump, as at this height, it is too low to freefall.

BASE jumps generally entail slower airspeeds than typical skydives (due to the limited altitude), a BASE jumper does not always reach terminal velocity. Skydivers use the airflow to stabilize their position. BASE jumpers, falling at lower speeds, have less aerodynamic control. The attitude of the body at the moment of jumping determines the stability of flight in the first few seconds, before sufficient airspeed has built up to enable aerodynamic stability. On low BASE jumps, parachute deployment takes place during this early phase of flight. If the parachute is deployed while the jumper is unstable, there is a high risk of entanglement or malfunction. The jumper may also not be facing the right direction. Such an off-heading opening is not as problematic in skydiving, but an off-heading opening that results in object strike has caused many serious injuries and deaths in BASE jumping.

BASE jumps are more hazardous than skydives primarily due to proximity to the object serving as the jump platform. BASE jumping frequently occurs in mountainous terrain, often having much smaller areas in which to land in comparison to a typical skydiving dropzone. BASE jumping is significantly more dangerous than similar sports such as skydiving from aircraft.

Legality 

BASE jumping is generally not illegal in most places. However, in some cases such as building and antenna jumps, jumping is often done covertly without the permission of owners, which can lead to charges such as trespassing. In some jurisdictions it may be permissible to use land until specifically told not to. The Perrine Bridge in Twin Falls, Idaho, is an example of a man-made structure in the United States where BASE jumping is allowed year-round without a permit.

In U.S. National Parks, BASE jumping is generally prohibited, unless special permission is given. Other U.S. public land, including land controlled by the Bureau of Land Management, does not ban air delivery, and there are numerous jumpable objects on BLM land.

The legal position is different at other sites and in other countries. For example, in Norway's Lysefjord (from the mountain Kjerag), BASE jumpers are made welcome. Many sites in the European Alps, near Chamonix and on the Eiger, are also open to jumpers. Some other Norwegian places, like the Troll Wall, are banned because of dangerous rescue missions in the past. In Austria, jumping from mountain cliffs is generally allowed, whereas the use of bridges (such as the Europabruecke near Innsbruck, Tirol) or dams is generally prohibited. Australia has some of the toughest stances on BASE jumping: it specifically bans BASE jumping from certain objects, such as the Sydney Harbour Bridge.

U.S. National Parks 
The National Park Service has banned BASE jumping in U.S. National Parks. The authority comes from 36 CFR 2.17(3), which prohibits, "Delivering or retrieving a person or object by parachute, helicopter, or other airborne means, except in emergencies involving public safety or serious property loss, or pursuant to the terms and conditions of a permit." Under that Regulation, BASE is not banned, but is allowable if a permit is issued by the Superintendent. The 2001 National Park Service Management Policies state that BASE "is not an appropriate public use activity within national park areas ..." (2001 Management Policy 8.2.2.7.) However, Policy 8.2.2.7 in the 2006 volume of National Park Service Management Policies, which superseded the 2001 edition, states "Parachuting (or BASE jumping), whether from an aircraft, structure, or natural feature, is generally prohibited by 36 CFR 2.17(a)(3). However, if determined through a park planning process to be an appropriate activity, it may be allowed pursuant to the terms and conditions of a permit."

Once a year, on the third Saturday in October ("Bridge Day"), permission to BASE jump has explicitly been granted at the New River Gorge Bridge in Fayetteville, West Virginia. The New River Gorge Bridge deck is 876 feet (267 m) above the river. This annual event attracts about 450 BASE jumpers and nearly 200,000 spectators. 1,100 jumps may occur during the six hours that it is legal, providing conditions are suitable.

During the early days of BASE jumping, the NPS issued permits that authorized jumps from El Capitan. This program ran for three months in 1980 and then collapsed amid allegations of abuse by unauthorized jumpers. The NPS has since vigorously enforced the ban, charging jumpers with "aerial delivery into a National Park". One jumper drowned in the Merced River while evading arresting park rangers, having declared "No way are they gonna get me. Let them chase me—I'll just laugh in their faces and jump in the river". Despite incidents like this one, illegal jumps continue in Yosemite at a rate estimated at a few hundred per year, often at night or dawn. El Capitan, Half Dome, and Glacier Point have been used as jump sites.

Safety 

A study of BASE jumping fatalities estimated that the overall annual fatality risk in 2002 was one fatality per 60 participants. A study of 20,850 BASE jumps from the Kjerag Massif in Norway reported nine fatalities over the 11-year period from 1995 to 2005, or one in every 2,317 jumps. However, at that site, one in every 254 jumps over that period resulted in a nonfatal accident. BASE jumping is one of the most dangerous recreational activities in the world, with a fatality and injury rate 43 times higher than that of parachuting from a plane.

, the BASE Fatality List records 444 deaths for BASE jumping since April 1981.

References

Further reading
 The Great Book of BASE. BirdBrain Publishing. July 2010.
 "The Ground's the Limit". Texas Monthly. December 1981.

External links

 Parachuting from fixed objects: descriptive study of 106 fatal events in BASE jumping 1981–2006
 Luigi Cani base jumps off a cliff
 A Sport to Die For ESPN, Michael Abrams
 First Dog Ever To BaseJump
 BASE Jumping adventures in the UK & Europe during the late 1980s, 1990s & early 2000s by Doug Blane
 Resources for Base Jumping

Air sports
Articles containing video clips
Jumping sports
Outdoor recreation
Parachuting